Blanca Luz Brum (31 May 1906, Pan de Azúcar, Maldonado - 7 August 1985, Santiago, Chile) was a writer, journalist, poet and artist from Uruguay.

Biography 
Brum was born on 31 May 1906 in Pan de Azúcar. Her family included her uncle, Balthazar Brum, a former president of Uruguay.

Family and relationships 

Much of Brum's reputation as a writer and artist was over-shadowed by her relationships. She was married several times: her first husband was the Peruvian poet, :es:Juan Parra del Riego. Riego kidnapped her from a convent and they married when she was 17; he died of tuberculosis three years later, leaving her with a young son. 

She married the Mexican painter, David Alfaro Siqueiros, who she met in May 1929. The couple lived in Los Angeles for a time. They married in 1932, but separated in 1933, whilst living in Montevideo. Whilst Siqueiros was imprisoned in 1930, she kept him supplied with artists materials. During this period, Brum wrote him many letters which were later published as Penitenciaría-Niño Perdido. Pablo Neruda claimed to have been her lover during this time. 

In 1935, divorced from Siqueiros, she lived in northern Chile and married to Jorge Béeche, a mining engineer and radical. At the end of 1938 their daughter María Eugenia was born.

Brum had two sons: the first with Riego, the second with her fourth husband Nils Brunson. They both died in car accidents, separately.

Literature and art 
She was also a painter, inspired by her poetry and politics. In the 1930s she was a role model for women in revolutionary art and politics. Some of her work, such as the poem Himno, is now viewed as very early ecofeminism.

Politics 
During the earlier part of her life, Brum was a supporter of left-wing militancy. During her time in Peru, she became a Marxist, influenced by José Carlos Mariátegui. In 1927 she was deported from Lima back to Uruguay, for her involvement in a communist plot involving other intellectuals, such as Magda Portal.

From 1943 on, she was related to the union sectors that gave rise to Peronism in Argentina, she served as press officer for the Ministry of Labour and Social Security under Juan Domingo Perón. She played a leading role as an organiser and agitator in the workers' mobilisation of 17 October 1945, which freed Perón from his arrest ordered by a military coup d'état and opened the way to his electoral victory the following year.

She was exiled during the Uruguayan dictatorship (1973–1985). She actively participated in politics in her country and in other Latin American countries where she lived, such as Chile or Mexico.

Life on Juan Fernandez Island 
Brum became extremely interested with life on the remote Juan Fernandez Island and was eventually secluded there, due to her role in helping the escape from prison of the Argentine politician Guillermo Patricio Kelly. She wrote poetry about life there.In 1981 she became a Chilean citizen and died there four years later.

Legacy

Works 
 Las llaves ardientes (1925)
 Levante (Lima 1928)
 Penitenciaría-Niño Perdido (Mexico, 1931)
 :es:Atmósfera arriba. Veinte poemas (Buenos Aires, 1933)
 Blanca Luz contra la corriente (Chile, 1935)
 Cantos de América del Sur (Chile, 1939)
 Del cancionero de Frutos Rivera (1943)
 El último Robinson (Chile, 1953)

In the media 
 I will not travel hidden is a documentary film by Pablo Zubizarreta about Brum and she is played by Mercedes Morán.
 The novel Falsas memorias: Blanca Luz Brum by Hugo Achugar re-tells Brum's life through fiction.

References 

1906 births
1985 deaths
Uruguayan women poets
20th-century Uruguayan women artists
Uruguayan women painters